Galliano is an unincorporated community and census-designated place (CDP) on the Bayou Lafourche in Lafourche Parish, Louisiana, United States. As of 2020, its population was 7,100. It is part of the Houma–Bayou Cane–Thibodaux metropolitan statistical area.

History
The area was named by the late postmaster Alzec Autin, who chose the name "Galliano" in honor of an original settler in the area formerly known as Côte Cheramie. Signor Antoine Galliano settled in the vicinity in the late 1700s and had a large farm and a citrus tree orchard. He came from the Kingdom of the Two Sicilies in the vicinity of Naples, Italy, where he was in the service of the King of Spain.

A popular local legend is that his wife, Julia, had no last name and was related closely to the King of Spain. Antoine Galliano or Galiano (Spanish spelling) had fallen in love with a lady of noble birth – probably a princess, since he was in the King's Guard. He and his wife were sent to Louisiana (New Spain) and settled in the area known now as Galliano. His descendants still live in the area, and the name Galliano is spelled in the Italian style, but some descendants spell it Galiano in the Spanish tradition.

The area was also the home of a large Acadian French or Cajun population, and Cajun French is a predominant language along with English.

Geography
Galliano is located in southern Lafourche Parish at  (29.448539, -90.307274), on both sides of Bayou Lafourche. The community is bordered to the northwest by Cut Off and to the south by Golden Meadow.

Louisiana Highway 1 runs through the community along the west bank of Bayou Lafourche, while Highway 308 runs along the east side. There are two bridges across Bayou Lafourche within the CDP. Four-lane Highway 3235 runs through the west side of the community. All three highway lead northwest (upriver)  to Larose and south  to Golden Meadow.

The Pointe-aux-Chenes Wildlife Management Area borders Galliano to the west. Access to the area can be had through a marina and boat launch in southwest Galliano.

Climate 
The climate in this area is characterized by hot, humid summers and generally mild to cool winters. According to the Köppen Climate Classification system, Galliano has a humid subtropical climate, abbreviated "Cfa" on climate maps.

Demographics

As of the 2020 United States census, there were 7,100 people, 2,841 households, and 1,907 families residing in the CDP.

Government and infrastructure
The United States Postal Service operates the Galliano Post Office.

Education
Lafourche Parish Public Schools operates public schools. Galliano Elementary School is in the community. Residents south of 17982 West Main and East 120 are instead zoned to Golden Meadow Lower Elementary and Golden Meadow Upper Elementary.

Residents south of West 106 (Bully Camp Road) and East 74 are zoned to Golden Meadow Middle School while those north are zoned to Larose-Cut Off Middle School.

South Lafourche High School is also in Galliano CDP and serves all of the territory.

Lafourche Parish Library operates the South Lafourche Library in Galliano, which has a Cut Off postal address.

Notable people

Dick Guidry, former member of the Louisiana House of Representatives
Hal Martin, stock car driver
Ed Orgeron, LSU football head coach
Teddy Roe, Chicago underworld figure
Alzina Toups, Cajun chef

References

External links
 Galliano Elementary School

Census-designated places in Lafourche Parish, Louisiana
Census-designated places in Louisiana
Census-designated places in Houma – Thibodaux metropolitan area